Four-time defending champion Rafael Nadal successfully defended his title, defeating David Ferrer in a rematch of the previous year's final, 6–2, 7–5, to win the singles title at the 2009 Barcelona Open. It was his record-extending fifth title at the Barcelona Open.

Seeds
The top eight seeds receive a bye into the second round.

Draw

Finals

Top half

Section 1

Section 2

Bottom half

Section 3

Section 4

Qualifying

Seeds

Qualifiers

Draw

First qualifier

Second qualifier

Third qualifier

Fourth qualifier

Fifth qualifier

Sixth qualifier

Seventh qualifier

External links
Main Draw
Qualifying Draw

Singles